Smoky Valley is a western novel by Donald Hamilton.

Plot summary
John Parrish doesn't run, even when the local land baron tries to burn him out of his home. The former soldier has to stay alive long enough to outwit his enemies.

Film adaptation
Filmed as The Violent Men in 1955 starring Glenn Ford, Barbara Stanwyck, and Edward G. Robinson

Publication history
1953, USA, Collier's, 12/11/1953, 12/25/1953, 1/8/1954, 1/22/1954, serial (literature)
1954, USA, Dell, Dell First Edition #18, paperback, reissued many times
1954, UK, Allan Wingate, as Rough Company, hardcover
1985, UK, Ulverscroft, large print edition, hardcover

1954 American novels
Western (genre) novels
Novels by Donald Hamilton
American novels adapted into films